Appassionato may refer to:

 Appassionato (music), a music term for "passionately"
 Appassionato (album), a 1990 album by jazz guitarist Joe Pass